Chaplygin (masculine) or Chaplygina (feminine; also masculine genitive) may refer to:

People
Sergey Chaplygin (1869–1942), Russian/Soviet physicist
Stanislav Chaplygin (b. 1967), retired Russian professional association football player
Valery Chaplygin (b. 1952), Soviet Olympic cyclist
Yury Chaplygin, Russian academician

Places
Chaplygin Urban Settlement, a municipal formation which Chaplygin Town Under District Jurisdiction in Chaplyginsky District of Lipetsk Oblast is incorporated as
Chaplygin (inhabited locality) (Chaplygina), several inhabited localities in Russia
Chaplygin (crater), a lunar crater named after Sergey Chaplygin
4032 Chaplygin, a minor planet

See also
Chaplygin gas
Chaplygin problem
Chaplygin sleigh
Chaplygin's equation
Chaplyginsky District